K. C. Hsiao (29 December 18974 November 1981) was a Chinese historian and political scientist, best known for his contributions to Chinese political science and history.

Life and career
Hsiao first travelled to the United States in 1920 on the Boxer Indemnity Scholarship Program, remaining there for six years and earning a Ph.D. from Cornell University in 1926. He returned to China and was professor of political science at Yenching University from 1930 to 1932, then at Tsinghua University from 1932 to 1937. With the outbreak of the Second Sino-Japanese War in 1937, he left to teach at Sichuan University and Kwang Hua University. Frustrated by the shortage of research materials produced by the Chinese Civil War, he went to teach at National Taiwan University in 1949, and continued to the United States later that year. He taught at the University of Washington from 1949 to 1968, initially as a visiting professor, and from 1959 as a tenured professor.

Hsiao's magnum opus is his two-volume Zhōngguó zhèngzhǐ sīxiǎng shǐ  ["History of Chinese Political Thought"], a work that traces Chinese political thought from its earliest recorded history in the Shang dynasty to his day.  An English translation of the first volume by the American Sinologist Frederick W. Mote was published by Princeton University Press in 1979, but the second volume has never been translated into English.  Hsiao hoped that the 20th century would come to embody 'liberal socialism', thereby reconciling the political movements of the 18th and 19th centuries.

Selected works
  Zhongguo zhengzhi sixiangshi 中國政治思想史 ("History of Chinese Political Thought"), 2 vols (1945). Chongqing: Shangwu yinshuguan. 
 Volume 1 translated into English by Frederick W. Mote as A History of Chinese Political Thought, Volume 1: From the Beginning to the Sixth Century AD (1979). Princeton: Princeton University Press.
 Rural China: Imperial Control in the Nineteenth Century (1960). Seattle: University of Washington Press.
  Wenxue jianwang lu 問學諫往錄 (1972). Taipei: Zhuanji wenxue chubanshe.
 Modern China and a New World: Kang Youwei, Reformer and Utopian, 1858–1927 (1975). Seattle, London: University of Washington Press.
  Xiao Gongquan xiansheng quanji 蕭公權先生全集 ("The Complete Works of Mr. Hsiao Kung-chüan"), 9 volumes (1982). Taipei: Lianjing chubanshe.

References

Citations

Works cited
"Biography of Hsiao Kung-ch'üan", in David C. Buxbaum, Frederick W. Mote, eds. Transition and Permanence: Chinese History and Culture. A Festschrift in Honor of Dr. Hsiao Kung-ch'uan. Hong Kong: Cathay Press, 1972, xiii-xvi.
 
  Knechtges, David R. "Wenwen ruya yishusheng – huainian Xiao Gongquan xiansheng 溫文儒雅一書生 – 懷念蕭公權先生" ("A Gentle and Refined Scholar – Remembering Mr. Hsiao Kung-ch'üan"), Zhongguo Shibao 中國時報, 25–26 February 1981.
 
  "Xiao Gongquan jiaoshou zhuzuo mulu 蕭公權教授著作目錄" ("Index to the Works of Professor Hsiao Kung-ch'üan"), Tsinghua Journal of Chinese Studies 8 (1970): 496–498.

1897 births
1981 deaths
20th-century Chinese historians
Boxer Indemnity Scholarship recipients
Chinese Civil War refugees
Chinese political scientists
Cornell University alumni
Historians from Jiangxi
Academic staff of the National Southwestern Associated University
Republic of China historians
People from Ji'an
Taiwanese people from Jiangxi
Tsinghua University alumni
Academic staff of Tsinghua University
University of Washington faculty
Academic staff of Yenching University
20th-century political scientists
Academic staff of Kwang Hua University